As of May 2019, Air Italy operated to 26 destinations in 13 countries from its hub in Milan and its focus city in Olbia. Air Italy announced that it would cease operations in February 2020.

This is a list of year-round and seasonal scheduled destinations which Air Italy flew to; the list includes the country, city, and airport names. Additionally, there are labels for airports that were the airline's hub, future cities, and former destinations that were discontinued prior to the shutdown.

Destinations

References

Lists of airline destinations
Air Italy
AQA Holding S.p.A.